Eimeria fraterculae is a species of alveolates belonging to the family Eimeriidae. It causes renal coccidiosis in the Atlantic puffin (Fratercula arctica).

Apart from its host-specificity, this coccidium can be recognised by the subspherical oocytes with unusually thick walls appearing distinctly greenish in colour. Coccidiosis caused by this parasite appears to be mild and nonfatal.

References

Conoidasida
Species described in 1986